Olli Pekka Zitting (13 March 1872 - 6 May 1929) was a Finnish farmer and politician. He was a member of the Parliament of Finland from 1926 to 1927, representing the National Coalition Party. Zitting was born in Nilsiä; Emil Rautaharju was his younger brother.

References

1872 births
1929 deaths
People from Nilsiä
People from Kuopio Province (Grand Duchy of Finland)
National Coalition Party politicians
Members of the Parliament of Finland (1924–27)